Žacléř is a town in Trutnov District in the Hradec Králové Region of the Czech Republic. It has about 3,100 inhabitants. The historic town centre is well preserved and is protected by law as an urban monument zone.

Administrative parts
Villages of Bobr and Prkenný Důl are administrative parts of Žacléř.

Geography
It borders Poland to the north. The eastern part of the municipal territory with the built-up area lies in the Broumov Highlands. The western part lies in the Giant Mountains and most of this territory is protected as the Krkonoše National Park.

History

Žacléř was founded on the Silesian trail, which was a trade route from Trutnov to Wrocław. A guarding castle for the protection of the trail was built here probably during the reign of Ottokar II of Bohemia, around 1260. The first written mention of the castle is from 1334.

From 1570, hard coal was mined here and from 1670, beer was brewed here. In the 19th century, the industrialization occurred. Paper mill, glassworks, and factories for textile, ceramics and soda were founded, but almost all operation ended during the 20th century. In 1992, the coal mining ended.

During the World War II, the German occupiers operated a women subcamp of the Gross-Rosen concentration camp in the town. The prisoners were mostly of Jewish women deported from German-occupied Poland and Hungary. The camp was liberated on 8 May 1945, coincidentally the day of the end of World War II in Europe.

Demographics

Economy
The ceramics factory was founded in 1878 and it is the only factory in Žacléř which has survived to this day. Since 1994, the company operates under the name Keramtech, s.r.o.

Sights

The Church of the Holy Trinity was built by Jesuits in 1677 and baroque rebuilt in 1732. The rectory next to the church is a late Baroque building from 1793.

The Renaissance Žacléř Castle was originally a Gothic castle, which burned down in 1523 and was rebuilt in the 16th century. It is not accessible to the public.

In the former Jan Šverma Mine there is the Mining Open-air museum Žacléř. It focuses on the mining equipment and history of mining in Žacléř, and on paleontological findings uncovered during mining. The history of the town and a porcelain collection are shown in the Town Museum.

Twin towns – sister cities

Žacléř is twinned with:
 Goldkronach, Germany
 Kowary, Poland
 Lubawka, Poland
 Lwówek Śląski County, Poland

Gallery

References

External links

 

Cities and towns in the Czech Republic
Populated places in Trutnov District